The 2006 Desafio Corona season was the third season of stock car racing in Mexico, and the final with the name Desafío Corona.

Schedule

The 2006 schedule included for first time Puebla as venue.

Results

Races

References

Desafio Corona season

NASCAR Mexico Series